The Battle of Bishapur took place during the Muslim conquest of Fars, a province of Persia, in the seventh century AD. The city was taken by the Muslim Rashidun forces after a siege.

Battle 
The battle ended the siege by Maja'a bin Masud's troops of the former city of Bishapur, known to the Arabs as Sabur.  In c. 643 Uthman ibn Abi al-As arrived at Bishapur with reinforcements from Basra and besieged the fortified town for several weeks before the town was forced to surrender. He then made a peace treaty with the inhabitants of the city. Further waves of reinforcements arrived under Sariyah bin Zuinem, then followed by forces under Suhail bin Adi, and lastly Asim bin Amr arrived in the region to completely pacify Kerman.

Subsequent events 
In 644, al-'Ala' ibn al-Hadrami, the Rashidun governor of Bahrain, once again attacked Fars, reaching as far as Estakhr, until he was repelled by the governor (marzban) of Fars, Shahrak. Some time later, Uthman ibn Abi al-As managed to establish at Tawwaj a Misr, a military base whose regimental system was based on the Immigrant Tribal (mainly Arabs) system, and shortly defeated and killed Shahrak near Rew-shahr (however other sources state that it was his brother who did it). A Persian convert to Islam, Hormuz ibn Hayyan al-'Abdi, was shortly sent by Uthman ibn Abi al-'As to attack a fortress known as Senez on the coast of Fars. After the accession of Uthman ibn Affan as the new Caliph of the Rashidun Caliphate on 11 November 644, the inhabitants of Bishapur, under the leadership of Shahrak's brother, declared independence, but were defeated.

Notes

References

Sources 
 

Battles involving the Sasanian Empire
Battles involving the Rashidun Caliphate
7th century in Iran
History of Fars Province
Muslim conquest of Persia
640s in the Rashidun Caliphate